Over The Rainbow (Traditional Chinese: 站出彩虹) is one of non-profit organizations in Hong Kong established by the chairman, Anthony Man Ho Fung and a small group registered social workers in 1998. They aimed at supporting families of lesbian and gay in Hong Kong which is aligned to the one of PFLAG. Over The Rainbow is the first organization of its kind in South East Asia.

Their hotline service helps the family members to understand them and encourage the communication in order to resolve the conflicts.

In the past few years, Over The Rainbow held various types activities like seminar, interview, workshop. In 2003 and 2005, it had organized a debate event with The Family Planning Association of Hong Kong and provided articles for the sex education website of the association.

References

LGBT organisations in Hong Kong